The Baker and the  Beauty is an American romantic comedy-drama television series developed by Dean Georgaris that premiered on ABC on April 13, 2020. It is an adaptation of the Israeli romantic-comedy series Beauty and the Baker. The original version is one of the highest-rated scripted series ever in Israel, and its episodes have been streamed on Amazon Prime Video. The American version is developed and executive-produced by Dean Georgaris, Becky Hartman Edwards, David Frankel, Avi Nir, Alon Shtruzman, Peter Traugott, Assi Azar and Rachel Kaplan for Universal Television. In June 2020, it was canceled after one season.

Cast

Main

 Victor Rasuk as Daniel Garcia, a baker at his family's business, Rafael's Bakery, who enters a whirlwind romance with supermodel Noa Hamilton
 Nathalie Kelley as Noa Hamilton, a famous Australian model and entrepreneur attracted to Daniel
 Dan Bucatinsky as Lewis, Noa's manager who seeks to protect her image at all costs.
 David Del Río as Mateo Garcia, Daniel's younger brother and a DJ known as MC Cubano.
 Michelle Veintimilla as Vanessa a realtor and Daniel's ex-girlfriend
 Belissa Escobedo as Natalie, Daniel and Mateo's younger sister who has high expectations placed on her by her parents
 Lisa Vidal as Mari Garcia, Daniel's, Mateo's and Natalie's mother
Carlos Gómez as Rafael Garcia, Daniel's, Mateo's and Natalie's father, and the owner of Rafael's Bakery

Recurring

 Georgina Reilly as Piper, Noa's best friend and part of her entourage, who supports Noa's and Daniel's relationship.
 Madelyn Sher as Amy, Natalie's love interest

Episodes

Production

Development
In November 2018, it was announced that an adaptation of the series was being developed by Dean Georgaris and David Frankel through Keshet Studios and Universal Television for ABC. The series is one of two collaborations between Georgaris and Universal for the 2019–20 season, along with Bluff City Law for NBC's fall schedule. Georgaris and Frankel are set to write and direct, respectively, and both will executive produce alongside Avi Nir, Alon Shtruzman, Peter Traugott, and Rachel Kaplan. In January 2019 ABC ordered the adaptation to pilot. On May 11, 2019, ABC green-lighted the series. A few days later, it was announced that the series would premiere as a mid-season replacement in the spring of 2020. On January 8, 2020, it was reported that the series was set to premiere on April 6, 2020. On January 29, 2020, the premiere date was moved to April 13, 2020. On June 15, 2020, ABC canceled the series after one season.

Casting
In February 2019, it was announced that Carlos Gomez, Lisa Vidal and Dan Bucatinsky had been cast in the pilot's lead roles. Alongside the pilot's order announcement, in March 2019 it was reported that Nathalie Kelley, Victor Rasuk, Michelle Veintimilla and David Del Rio had joined the cast. In September 2019, Georgina Reilly was cast in a recurring role.

Filming
The pilot was filmed in Atlanta while rest of the series was filmed in Puerto Rico.

Reception

Critical response
On Rotten Tomatoes, the series holds an approval rating of 89% based on 9 reviews, with an average rating of 6.8/10.

Ratings

References

External links

2020 American television series debuts
2020 American television series endings
2020s American comedy-drama television series
2020s American LGBT-related comedy television series
2020s American LGBT-related drama television series
2020s American romantic comedy television series
2020s American workplace comedy television series
2020s American workplace drama television series
American Broadcasting Company original programming
American television series based on Israeli television series
English-language television shows
Fashion-themed television series
Modeling-themed television series
Television series by ABC Studios
Television series by Universal Television
Television shows set in Miami
Television series set in hotels
Hispanic and Latino American television